Nikephoros I or Nicephorus I (750 – 26 July 811) was Byzantine emperor from 802 to 811. Having served Empress Irene as genikos logothetēs, he subsequently ousted her from power and took the throne himself. In reference to his career before becoming emperor, he is sometimes surnamed "the Logothete" (ὁ Λογοθέτης) and "Genikos" or "Genicus" (ὁ Γενικός). Nikephoros pursued wars against the Arabs and Bulgarians, with mixed results; while invading Bulgaria he was defeated and killed at the Battle of Pliska.

Background
Sources outside the Byzantine context, including Michael the Syrian, al-Tabari, and Mas'udi, preserve the tradition that Nikephoros was of Ghassanid Arab origin. al-Tabari claims that he derived this information from Byzantine sources,  but no surviving Byzantine chronicle makes explicit mention of the emperor's ethnic background. The modern scholar Paul Julius Alexander suggests that al-Tabari did transmit information present in Byzantine writings; as an example he cites an apocalyptic text, preserved in a “hopelessly corrupt” copy, in which the emperor is said to be "from the race of Gopsin".

Reign

A patrician from Seleucia Sidera, Nikephoros was appointed finance minister (logothetēs tou genikou) by the Empress Irene. He figured prominently in a courtiers' power struggle which eventually dethroned Irene and sent her into exile. With the support of his co-conspirators, Nikephoros was installed as the new emperor on 31 October 802. He crowned his son Staurakios co-emperor in 803.

Nikephoros embarked on a general reorganization of the Roman Empire and a strengthening of its frontiers. He created new themes in the Balkans, populating them with Greeks resettled from Anatolia. Needing large sums to increase his military forces, he managed the empire's finances with a rigor that earned the hostility of his subjects. According to two later chronicles, the 10th-century Theophanes Continuatus and the 13th-century Synopsis Chronike, the revolt of the general Bardanes Tourkos in 803 may have been prompted by displeasure over Nikephoros' handling of army pay. Nikephoros secretly negotiated with two of Bardanes' key supporters, the generals Leo and Michael, who convinced the rebel army to disperse. Bardanes was captured, blinded, and relegated to a monastery. A conspiracy headed by the patrician Arsaber had a similar result.

Tax imposts, and other attempts to exercise imperial control upon the church, alienated Nikephoros from the clergy. Although he appointed an iconodule, also named Nikephoros, as patriarch, Emperor Nikephoros was portrayed as a villain by ecclesiastical historians like Theophanes the Confessor.

In 803, Nikephoros concluded a treaty, called the "Pax Nicephori", with Charlemagne, but refused to recognize the latter's imperial dignity. Relations deteriorated and led to a war over Venice in 806–810. In the process, Nikephoros had quelled a Venetian rebellion in 807, but suffered extensive losses to the Franks.  The conflict was resolved only after Nikephoros' death, and Venice, Istria, the Dalmatian coast and Southern Italy were assigned to the East, while Rome, Ravenna and the Pentapolis were included in the Western realm.

By withholding the tribute which Irene had agreed to pay to the caliph Hārūn al-Rashīd, Nikephoros committed himself to a war against the Arabs. Compelled by Bardanes' disloyalty to take the field himself, he sustained a severe defeat at the Battle of Krasos in Phrygia (805). In 806 a Muslim army of 135,000 men invaded the Empire. Unable to counter the Muslim numbers, Nikephoros agreed to make peace on condition of paying 50,000 nomismata immediately and a yearly tribute of 30,000 nomismata. With a succession struggle enveloping the caliphate on the death of Hārūn al-Rashīd in 809, Nikephoros was free to deal with Krum, Khan of Bulgaria, who was harassing his northern frontiers and had just conquered Serdica (Sofia).

In 811, Nikephoros invaded Bulgaria, defeated Krum twice, and sacked the Bulgarian capital Pliska. The Chronicle of the 12th-century patriarch of the Syrian Jacobites, Michael the Syrian, describes the brutalities and atrocities of Nikephoros: "Nikephoros, emperor of the Roman Empire, walked into the Bulgarians' land: he was victorious and killed great number of them. He reached their capital, seized it and devastated it. His savagery went to the point that he ordered to bring their small children, got them tied down on earth and made thresh grain stones to smash them." During Nikephoros' retreat, the imperial army was ambushed and destroyed in Varbishki mountain passes at the Battle of Pliska by Krum. Nikephoros was killed during the battle, whereafter Krum ordered his decapitation. Krum is said to have made a drinking-cup of Nikephoros' skull.

Family
By an unknown wife Nikephoros I had at least two children:
 Staurakios, who succeeded as emperor.
 Prokopia, who married Michael I Rangabe, emperor 811–813.

See also

List of Byzantine emperors

References

Sources

The Oxford Dictionary of Byzantium, ed. by Alexander Kazhdan, Oxford University Press, 1991.
 

750 births
811 deaths
9th-century Byzantine emperors
Byzantine people of the Byzantine–Bulgarian Wars
8th-century Byzantine people
8th-century births
Roman emperors killed in battle
Monarchs killed in action
Christian monarchs
800s in the Byzantine Empire
810s in the Byzantine Empire
Byzantine people of Arab descent
Nikephorian dynasty
Logothetai tou genikou